was a renowned Japanese poet and photographer. He was born in the city of Ise, Mie Prefecture, Japan.

References

Japanese photographers
English-language writers from Japan
1902 births
1978 deaths
People from Ise, Mie